Buckeye Crossroads is a small unincorporated community in extreme eastern Baca County, Colorado, United States. It is located at the intersection of Colorado State highways 89 and 116. Buckeye Crossroads had a population of only 7 in 2000, and is located many miles in every direction from any other town, including the county seat of Springfield, Colorado which is approximately 37 driving miles east-northeast. The town is also referred to as Lycan, Colorado.

Geography
Buckeye Crossroads is located at  (37.55775,-102.11035).

The community is just over 5 miles from the state border with Kansas.

References 

Unincorporated communities in Baca County, Colorado
Unincorporated communities in Colorado